A Spitz nevus is a benign skin lesion. A type of melanocytic nevus, it affects the epidermis and dermis.

It is also known as an epithelioid and spindle-cell nevus, and misleadingly as a benign juvenile melanoma, and Spitz's juvenile melanoma). 
The name juvenile melanoma is generally no longer used as it is neither a melanoma, nor does it occur only in children.

Pathophysiology

The cause of Spitz nevi is not yet known.  There is an association with sunburn, but causation is not established.  Genetic studies of Spitz nevi have shown that most cells have the normal number of chromosomes, however a minority (25%) of cells have been shown to contain extra copies of parts of some chromosomes, such as the short arm of chromosome 11 (11p).

Diagnosis

On histopathology, Spitz nevi characteristically have vertically arranged nests of nevus cells that have both a spindled and an epithelioid morphology. Apoptotic cells may be seen at the dermoepidermal junction.  The main histologic differential diagnoses are pigmented spindle cell nevus and malignant melanoma.

Treatment 
Surgical removal is usually performed, even though it is benign.

Epidemiology
Spitz nevi are uncommon.  Their annual incidence was estimated in a coastal population of sub-tropical Queensland to be 1.4 cases per 100,000 people.  For comparison, the annual incidence of melanoma in the same population, which is high by world standards is 25.4 cases per 100,000 people.

Although they are most commonly found on people in their first two decades of life, the age range for people with Spitz nevi is from 6 months to 71 years, with a mean age of 22 years and a median age of 19 years.

Eponym
The lesion is named after Sophie Spitz, the pathologist who originally described it in 1948.

See also 
 List of cutaneous conditions
 List of genes mutated in pigmented cutaneous lesions
 Melanoma with features of a Spitz nevus

References

External links 

Melanocytic nevi and neoplasms
Rare diseases